Talking trees are a form of sapient trees in mythologies and stories.

Ben Bryne initially said that in Greek mythology, all the trees in the Dodona (northwestern Greece, Epirus) grove (the forest beside the sanctuary of Zeus) became endowed with the gift of prophecy, and the oaks not only spoke and delivered oracles while in a living state, but when built into the ship Argo the wood spoke and warned of approaching calamities.

The rustling of the leaves on an oak tree was regarded as the voice of Zeus.

Examples

 The talking tree can be seen in the Cartoon Network animated TV show series Courage The Cowardly Dog season 2 episode The Magic Tree of Nowhere.
 In the book Shahnameh (Book of Kings) by Firdawsi (d. 1020), Alexander the Great visited a talking tree.
 The Greek talking elm: Philostratus spoke about two philosophers arguing beneath an elm tree in Ethiopia which spoke up to add to the conversation.
 The Indian Tree of the Sun and the Moon told the future. Two parts of the tree trunk spoke depending on the time of day; in the daytime the tree spoke as a male and at night it spoke as a female. Marco Polo is said to have visited this tree.
 The weeping date palm tree: Muhammad, when delivering his sermons, used to stand by or lean on a date palm tree. When a pulpit was built elsewhere and Muhammad started to give his sermon from the pulpit, the tree began to cry like a child. Muhammad then descended from his pulpit and consoled the tree by embracing it and stroking it. He said, "It was crying for (missing) what it used to hear of religious knowledge given near to it." This incident is recorded in the authentic Islamic Hadith traditions and is said to have been witnessed by everyone present at the congregation.
 Oracular trees are sometimes attributed with the ability to speak to individuals, especially those gifted in divination. In particular, Druids were said to be able to consult oak trees for divinatory purposes, as were the Streghe with Rowan trees.
 In the Old English poem Dream of the Rood, a tree talks about being cut down and used as the cross on which Christ was crucified.
 In Ireland, a tree may help a person look for a leprechaun's gold, although it normally does not know where the gold is.
 In Medieval literature, in the Arthurian legend, Merlin is turned into a tree by Viviane.
 In Dante Alighieri's Divine Comedy story Inferno, the protagonists (Dante and Virgil) speak with suicides who have been turned into trees in Hell.
 The Forest of Fighting Trees in The Wonderful Wizard of Oz reside in Quadling Country. Dorothy Gale, Scarecrow, Tin Man, and Cowardly Lion had to go through the Forest of Fighting Trees in order to get to Glinda the Good Witch. Tin Man used his axe on the Fighting Trees. In the 1939 film version, apple trees become annoyed with Dorothy when she picks an apple from one of them. The Scarecrow helps by provoking the apple trees into throwing their apples at him, which Dorothy can then collect.
 In Dorothy of Oz, there is a group of talking trees that grow on the banks of the Munchkin River in Gillikin Country and have known Wiser the Owl. Upon the advice of Wiser, Dorothy, Scarecrow, Tin Man, and Cowardly Lion had to convince the talking trees there to donate their limbs in order to make a boat that can take them to Glinda. The talking trees agree to help Dorothy and also help to coordinate the construction of the boat that became Tugg (who then began to speak after Dorothy used paint made from water and berries to make a face for Tugg). Besides taking Dorothy and her friends to Quadling Country, Tugg also traveled the Munchkin River where he would later tell the talking trees what he had seen on his journey.
 The book The Lord of the Rings and its film adaptations feature the Huorns and Old Man Willow.
 In English folklore, willows were said to stalk humans.
 The novel A Spell for Chameleon by Piers Anthony includes the character Justin Tree, a talking tree. The character returns in Zombie Lover and Swell Foop.
 In the 1995 Disney animated film Pocahontas and the 1998 sequel Pocahontas II: Journey to a New World, the heroine is advised by a tree known as Grandmother Willow (voiced by Linda Hunt).
 In The Legend of Zelda series, the Great Deku Tree is a massive sentient tree who helps Link in his quests, and also serves as the guardian of the forest and earth.
 The Yaqui have a legend of a talking tree. The tree told of the Christian God and the priests who would soon arrive to teach the people new beliefs and new ways.
 Artist Théodore Rousseau (1812–1867) is quoted as saying "I also heard the voices of the trees ... whose passions I uncovered. I wanted to talk with them ... and put my finger on the secret of their majesty."
 The Shrek franchise has talking trees.
 Rainforest Cafe has their own talking tree named Tracy Tree.
 In Animorphs, some trees on the Andalite home world are said to "talk." In actuality, they are telekinetic and are rarely intelligent enough to use words, instead sharing emotions with those who touch them.

See also
 Daphne
 Dryad
 Mesoamerican world tree
 Tree deity
 Tree of life
 Tree worship
 Waqwaq
 World tree
 Vegetation deity

References

External links

Encyclopedia of Mythical Trees and Deities - archived version

Trees in mythology
Fictional trees